Catholic Church in the Americas may refer to:

 Catholic Church in North America
 Catholic Church in Latin America